The Texas Wild was a World TeamTennis team that played at the Four Seasons Resort and Club Dallas at Las Colinas in Irving, Texas, USA. The team was known as the Kansas City Explorers from 1993 until the 2012 season, before moving to Texas. With WTT's contraction of the Las Vegas Neon in 2014, the Wild became the oldest franchise currently operating in the league.

Following the 2014 season, rumors circulated that the Wild may relocate due to poor attendance. In an interview with the Fort Worth Star-Telegram in January 2015, Wild owner Jeff Launius would not confirm that the team would play the 2015 season in Irving. He said, "I’m working on several options for 2015, none of which I am ready to reveal at this time." On February 23, 2015, WTT announced that a new ownership group had taken control of the Wild and moved the team to Citrus Heights, California, renaming it the California Dream.

Final squad
Reference:

On-court personnel
  Brent Haygarth – Head Coach
  Alex Bogomolov, Jr.
  Darija Jurak
  Anabel Medina Garrigues
  Aisam Qureshi
  Tim Smyczek

Front office
 Jeff Launius – Owner and General Manager
 Mel Launius – Owner

References

External links
Official Team Website

Sports in Irving, Texas
Sports clubs established in 2012
2012 establishments in Texas
Tennis in Texas
Defunct World TeamTennis teams
Sports clubs disestablished in 2015
2015 disestablishments in Texas